Hakim is one of the woredas in the Harari Region of Ethiopia.

References 

Districts of Harari Region